The Arikara War was an armed conflict between the United States, their allies from the Sioux (or Dakota) tribe and Arikara Native Americans that took place in the summer of 1823, along the Missouri River in present-day South Dakota. It was the first Indian war west of the Missouri fought by the U.S. Army and its only conflict ever with the Arikara. The war came as a response to an Arikara attack on trappers, called "the worst disaster in the history of the Western fur trade".

Background
When Lewis and Clark reached Arikara settlements in 1804, the inhabitants did not show hostility to the expedition. In 1806, during a trip to the United States capital, the Arikara leader Chief Ankedoucharo died. Ankedoucharo died of natural causes, but it was widely believed among the Arikara that he was deliberately murdered by Americans. Later, as a result of the growing activity of fur trading companies, contact between Arikara and white merchants became more frequent, and skirmishes eventually followed. At the start of 1823, the Arikara "attacked the Missouri Fur Company's Fort Recovery [a trading post for the Sioux] and killed two traders".

The Sioux, both Yankton and Yanktonai east of the Missouri and Lakota on the west side, had for long been at war with the Arikara, interrupted by short truces on Sioux terms. The Arikaras in question were living in a double village on the west shore of the Missouri, six or seven miles (about 10 km) upstream from the mouth of Grand River. A small creek separated the two fortified villages of earth lodges, each with a heavy frame of wood.

The causes of the war are not well recorded, but the trading relationship of the Arikara with white traders was certainly a factor.  The Arikara lived in permanent settlements for most of the year where they farmed, fished and hunted buffalo on the surrounding plains.  However, this was insufficient to sustain them and they relied on being a center of trade with neighboring tribes to survive.  William Henry Ashley's expedition to directly acquire furs and pelts cut out the Arikara in their role as trading middle-men and was thus a direct threat to their livelihood.  There was also the issue of their desire to have a trading post on their territory so that they could have easy access to manufactured goods.  They resented the fact that their long-time enemies, the Sioux, had such posts, but they did not.  Ashley had been asked to set up a trading post when he was in the area in 1822.  Not wishing to limit his operations by having to maintain a permanent base, Ashley instead promised the Arikara that he would have the goods they asked for shipped to them directly from St. Louis.  Ashley had not made good this promise at the time of his 1823 expedition, and possibly never intended to. The death of Ankedoucharo was probably not a direct cause of the war, but it did add to the general resentment.

The assault and the Arikara War (1823)
On 2 June 1823, Arikara warriors assaulted trappers working for Ashley's Rocky Mountain Fur Company on the Missouri River, killing about 15 people. The surviving trappers retreated down the river and hid in shelters, where they stayed for more than a month.

The United States responded with a combined force of 230 soldiers of the 6th Infantry, 750 Sioux allies, and 50 trappers and other company employees under the command of Lieutenant Colonel Henry Leavenworth, Fort Atkinson, present-day Nebraska: "The forces thus organized, including regular troops, mountaineers, voyageurs and Indians, were styled the Missouri Legion."

The 750 warriors were part Yankton and Yanktonai Sioux, part western Sioux from the Brule, the Blackfeet, and the Hunkpapa divisions. The Lakotas "... appeared anxious to join us". The Indian force received promises of Arikara horses and spoils, and with the enemy's villages fallen new ranges would open for the Sioux.

On 9 August 1823, Leavenworth arrived at the Arikara villages and commenced the attack using his Sioux cavalry, but this was held off by the Arikara.  On 10 August, Leavenworth ordered an artillery bombardment.  This was largely ineffective, the shots falling beyond the villages, at which point Leavenworth ordered an infantry attack.  Like the Sioux auxiliaries, the regular infantry also failed to break into the villages. They left the battlefield with some captured horses and laden with corn taken from the farming Indians' fields.

On 11 August 1823, Leavenworth negotiated a peace treaty: "In making this treaty, I met with every possible difficulty which it was in the power of the Missouri Fur Company to throw in my way."

Fearing further attacks, the Arikara left the village that night.  Leavenworth set off to return to Fort Atkinson on 15 August.  The Arikara village was burned behind him by resentful members of the Missouri Fur Company, much to Leavenworth's anger.

The US Army suffered the first casualties in the West during the Arikara War. Seven people drowned in the Missouri.

Aftermath

The Arikara refugees returned the following spring, restoring the villages. After the destruction of the Arikara village on 2 June, some Americans angrily accused the Hudson's Bay Company of stirring up the Arikara against the American trappers in order to profit from their reduced involvement in the fur trade thanks to the war. Representatives for the Hudson's Bay Company denied this, pointing out they had never had any trappers contracted by them working in the region.

The hostility between the United States and the Arikara ended officially on 18 July 1825, when the two opponents signed a peace treaty. The U.S. Army and the Arikara never engaged in battle again.

As for the Sioux, "the result of the [Leavenworth] expedition ruined the reputation of all whites in the eyes of the Indians". The Sioux continued to attack the Arikaras and press them north, from one village to another. In 1851, the western Sioux claimed the 1823 battleground as Lakota territory and later received formal treaty recognition on the former Arikara land.

Although brief, the conflict was noted for two reasons: it was the first military conflict between the United States and Native Americans in the West, setting the tone for future encounters between whites and other Native American groups; and since Leavenworth did not completely defeat the Arikara, his leniency toward them sparked a great debate between white Americans demanding subjugation of the natives and those advocating for peaceful cohabitation.

The Arikara eventually settled with the Mandan and Hidatsa on the Fort Berthold Reservation in North Dakota. Many Arikara and Crow people became Indian scouts during the height of the Sioux Wars.

Archaeological work at the location of the Arikara villages (Leavenworth site (39CO9)) in 1932 gave a clue to the futile shelling of the earth lodges more than 100 years earlier. The upper stratums of earth hid a number of unexploded shells.

In the media 
A fictionalized representation of the 1823 attack by the Arikara on the Rocky Mountain Fur Company appears in the 2015 film The Revenant from the perspective of trapper Hugh Glass.

References

 Roger L. Nichols, The American Indian: Past and Present, University of Oklahoma Press, 2014 .

Further reading
 Roger L. Nichols. Warrior Nations: The United States and Indian Peoples. Norman, OK: University of Oklahoma Press, 2013.
 Nester, William R. The Arikara War: The first Plains Indian war, 1823. — Mountain Press Publishing Company, 2001. — 257 p.

External links
 The Arikara War — The First Plains Indian War (Legends of America)

Native American history of South Dakota
Pre-statehood history of South Dakota
1823 in the United States
Wars between the United States and Native Americans
Indian wars of the American Old West
Conflicts in 1823
June 1823 events
August 1823 events